The Herkless Prize was founded in 1911 and awarded annually to a woman graduate with honours of the year for distinction in the examinations for the degree of Master of Arts and BMus at the University of Glasgow.

References

Awards by university and college in the United Kingdom
University of Glasgow
Awards established in 1911